Sujin Boriharnwanaket (born January 13, 1927) is a Thai Vipassana and Abhidhamma teacher. She graduated from Triam Udom High School and has published numerous books and articles in Thai and English.

Awards
On March 6, 2007 she was given the Outstanding Woman in Buddhism award in Bangkok at the United Nations office.

Books in English
Answering Dhamma Questions, Adelaide : Adelaide Dhamma Study Group, 1977
The Development of Insight, Bangkok : Thailand : Abhidhamma foundation, 1979
Metta: Loving kindness in Buddhism, Nina van Gorkom translation : Triple Gem, 1995
Taking Refuge in Buddhism, Nina van Gorkom translation : Zolag, 1996
Realities and concepts : the Buddha's explanation of the world, Nina van Gorkom translation : Thailand : Dhamma Study and Support Foundation, 2000
A Survey of Paramattha Dhammas, Nina van Gorkom translation : Dhamma Study and Support Foundation, 2005
The Perfections Leading to Enlightenment, Nina van Gorkom translation : Zolag, 2007

References

External links
Readable version of "A Survey of Paramattha Dhammas"
abhidhamma.org
downloadable books by Boriharnwanaket
vipassana.info
The Perfections Leading to Enlightenment (Audiobook)

1927 births
Living people
Sujin Boriharnwanaket
Sujin Boriharnwanaket
Sujin Boriharnwanaket
Sujin Boriharnwanaket
Buddhist writers
Sujin Boriharnwanaket
Sujin Boriharnwanaket